Nanhaipotamon is a genus of freshwater crabs, in the subfamily Potamiscinae, found in southern China and Taiwan. As of 2018, 18 species have been described. The genus is named after the South China Sea (literally: 'South Sea'), for it occurs mostly in coastal areas. The genus was first described by R. Bott in 1968 as Isolapotamon (Nanhaipotamon), i.e., a subgenus of Isolapotamon.

Description 
Depending on the species, the carapace may be vividly coloured, especially in males of N. hongkongense (orange to red), N. aculatum (dark blue) and N. zhuhaiense (light blue). Chelipeds are usually unequal, more so in larger males, where one cheliped is relatively much larger than the other. This may be of use in territorial fights, as the crabs are very aggressive towards conspecifics.

Distribution and habitat 
Crabs of the genus Nanhaipotamon inhabit the banks of small to medium-sized hill streams, paddy fields and swamps. Although not particularly a lowland species, they usually do not occur above approximately 500 meters above sea level. Most species are nocturnal, leaving their burrows at night to forage. Species belonging to this genus have been recorded from Hong Kong, Macau, Guangdong, Fujian, Zhejiang, Taiwan and Dongyin Island.

Conservation 
Although crabs of the genus Nanhaipotamon are subject to the pet trade, not much is known about the population status of most species, and many are only known from their respective type locality. Of the 18 currently accepted species, only three have meaningful IUCN assessments, the rest all being data deficient. Nearly a third of known species were described in the last ten years, and yet there is evidence that a lot more may be discovered in the near future. The gambling hub of Macau is one of the most densely populated places in the world, and a new species has been described there as recently as 2018. The rapid urbanization of coastal regions, habitat destruction, impacts on water quality and collection for consumption and the pet trade, pose serious threats to most known species.

Health 
Nanhaipotamon fujianense is known to be an intermediate host for the lung fluke species Paragonimus skrjabini.

Species 
 Nanhaipotamon aculatum Dai, 1997
 Nanhaipotamon dongyinense Shih, Chen & Wang, 2005
 Nanhaipotamon formosanum (Parisi, 1916)
 Nanhaipotamon fujianense Lin, Cheng & Chen, 2013
 Nanhaipotamon guangdongense Dai, 1997
 Nanhaipotamon hepingense Dai, 1997
 Nanhaipotamon hongkongense (Shen, 1940)
 Nanhaipotamon huaanense Dai, 1997
 Nanhaipotamon macau Huang, Wong & Ahyong, 2018
 Nanhaipotamon nanriense Dai, 1997
 Nanhaipotamon pinghense Dai, 1997
 Nanhaipotamon pingtanense Lin, Cheng & Chen, 2012
 Nanhaipotamon pingyuanense Dai, 1997
 Nanhaipotamon wenzhouense Dai, 1997
 Nanhaipotamon wupingense Cheng, Yang, Zhong & Li, 2003
 Nanhaipotamon xiapuense Cheng, Li & Zhang, 2009
 Nanhaipotamon yongchuense Dai, 1997
 Nanhaipotamon zhuhaiense Huang, Huang & Ng, 2012

Gallery

References

External links 
 
 

Potamoidea
Freshwater crustaceans of Asia
Decapod genera